Argast is a surname. Notable people with the surname include:

 Ed Argast, American football coach and player
 Georg Argast (1899–?), Swiss wrestler